Edna Buchanan (née Rydzik, born March 16, 1939) is an American journalist and writer best known for her crime mystery novels. She won the 1986 Pulitzer Prize for General News Reporting "for her versatile and consistently excellent police beat reporting."

Early life
Buchanan was born in Paterson, New Jersey. In high school she worked in a coat factory and after graduating  she worked, along with her mother, at a Western Electric plant. She attended Montclair State College, where she took a creative writing course and was encouraged to become a writer. She and her mother took a vacation to Miami Beach and, according to Buchanan, she knew as soon as she walked off the plane that she wanted to leave Paterson.

Career
Buchanan began her career writing for the Miami Beach Sun, covering crime, local politics, society, celebrity interviews and occasionally letters to the editor. In 1973, she began working as a police beat reporter for the Miami Herald. In 1986 she won the Pulitzer Prize in General News Reporting.

Her book Miami, It's Murder was nominated for an Edgar Award in 1995.

Buchanan's autobiographical book The Corpse Had A Familiar Face inspired two TV movies starring Elizabeth Montgomery: The Corpse Had a Familiar Face (1994) and Deadline for Murder: From the Files of Edna Buchanan (1995). Her novel Nobody Lives Forever was made into a TV movie in 1998.

Buchanan was embarrassed in 1990 when she was quoted extensively in the book Blue Thunder: How the Mafia Owned and Finally Murdered Cigarette Boat King Donald Aronow, by Thomas Burdick and Charlene Mitchell.Burdick ... led her to believe that he was seeking only background information, never used a tape recorder or took notes, asked her to hypothesize about people and situations, then quoted her as if she were stating fact.  According to Buchanan, she tried to have her name and the quotes removed from the book after she read the galley proofs, but she was told by the publisher that it was too late.

She was profiled in an article by Calvin Trillin in 1986 for The New Yorker, which was included in an anthology of his work entitled Killings.

Buchanan is featured in the 2018 documentary film The Last Resort.

Books

Fiction
Nobody Lives Forever (1990)
Naked Came the Manatee (Putnam, 1996), by Buchanan and 12 others
Pulse (1998)
Legally Dead (2008)
A Dark and Lonely Place (2011)

Britt Montero Series 
  Contents Under Pressure (1992)
 Miami, It's Murder (1994)
  Suitable for Framing (1995)
 Act of Betrayal (1996)
 Margin of Error (1997)
 Garden of Evil (1999)
  You Only Die Twice (2001)
  The Ice Maiden (2002)
Love Kills (2007)

Craig Burch Series 
  Cold Case Squad (2004)
 Shadows (2005)

Nonfiction
Carr, Five Years of Rape and Murder: from the personal account of Robert Frederick Carr III, 1979
The Corpse Had a Familiar Face: Covering Miami, America's Hottest Beat, 1987
Never Let Them See You Cry: More from Miami, America's Hottest Beat, 1992
Vice: Life and Death on the Streets of Miami, 1992

See also

Notes

References

External links
 
 
 

 

1939 births
Living people
20th-century American novelists
21st-century American novelists
American mystery writers
American women novelists
Novelists from Florida
Montclair State University alumni
Writers from Paterson, New Jersey
Miami Herald people
Pulitzer Prize for Breaking News Reporting winners
Women mystery writers
20th-century American women writers
21st-century American women writers
Novelists from New Jersey
American women non-fiction writers
20th-century American non-fiction writers
21st-century American non-fiction writers